Oh What the Future Holds is the sixth studio album by American deathcore band Fit for an Autopsy. The album was released January 14, 2022 through Nuclear Blast and was produced by the band's guitarist Will Putney. It has received positive reviews from critics.

Track listing

Personnel 
Credits adapted from album's liner notes.

Fit for an Autopsy
 Joe Badolato – lead vocals
 Pat Sheridan – guitars, backing vocals
 Will Putney – guitars, production, engineering, mixing, mastering
 Tim Howley – guitars
 Peter "Blue" Spinazola – bass
 Josean Orta – drums

Charts

References

External links 
 

2022 albums
Fit for an Autopsy albums